Rezvan Rural District may refer to various places in Iran:
 Rezvan Rural District (Jiroft County), Kerman Province
 Rezvan Rural District (Rafsanjan County), Kerman Province
 Rezvan Rural District (Semnan Province)